Procecidochares is a genus of tephritid  or fruit flies in the family Tephritidae.

Species
Procecidochares alani Steyskal, 1974
Procecidochares anthracina (Doane, 1899)
Procecidochares atra (Loew, 1862)
Procecidochares australis Aldrich, 1929
Procecidochares blanci Goeden & Norrbom, 2001
Procecidochares blantoni Hering, 1940
Procecidochares flavipes Aldrich, 1929
Procecidochares gibba (Loew, 1873)
Procecidochares grindeliae Aldrich, 1929
Procecidochares kristineae Goeden, 1997
Procecidochares lisae Goeden, 1997
Procecidochares minuta (Snow, 1894)
Procecidochares montana (Snow, 1894)
Procecidochares pleuralis Aldrich, 1929
Procecidochares pleuritica Hendel, 1914
Procecidochares polita (Loew, 1862)
Procecidochares stonei Blanc & Foote, 1961
Procecidochares suttoni Norrbom, 2010
Procecidochares utilis Stone, 1947

References

 
Tephritinae
Tephritidae genera
Diptera of North America
Diptera of South America